
Gmina Nagłowice is a rural gmina (administrative district) in Jędrzejów County, Świętokrzyskie Voivodeship, in south-central Poland.

Villages
Gmina Nagłowice contains the villages and settlements of Brynica Mokra, Caców, Chycza-Brzóstki, Cierno-Żabieniec, Deszno, Jaronowice, Kuźnice, Nagłowice, Rakoszyn, Rejowiec, Ślęcin, Trzciniec, Warzyn Drugi, Warzyn Pierwszy, Zagórze and Zdanowice.

Neighbouring gminas
Gmina Nagłowice is bordered by the gminas of Jędrzejów, Moskorzew, Oksa, Radków, Sędziszów and Słupia.

References
Polish official population figures 2006

Naglowice
Jędrzejów County